Siaki Ika (born November 7, 2000) is an American football defensive tackle. He played college football at LSU, where he was a member of the team that won the 2020 College Football Playoff National Championship, before transferring to Baylor the following season.

Early life and high school
Ika grew up in Salt Lake City, Utah and attended East High School. He initially committed to play college football at BYU, but later re-opened his recruitment. Ika ultimately committed to play at LSU over offers from Florida, Oregon, USC, and Utah.

College career
Ika joined the LSU Tigers as an early enrollee in January 2019. He played in 13 games as part of the Tigers' defensive line rotation during his freshman year as the Tigers won the 2020 College Football Playoff National Championship. Ika entered the NCAA transfer portal after playing in the first three games of his sophomore season in 2020.

Ika ultimately transferred to Baylor for the 2021 season. He also considered offers from Utah, Oregon, BYU, and Georgia. Ika recorded 24 tackles with six tackles for loss and four sacks in his first season at Baylor and was named the Big 12 Conference Defensive Newcomer of the Year and second team All-Big 12.

References

External links
Baylor Bears bio
LSU Tigers bio

Living people
American football defensive tackles
Players of American football from Salt Lake City
Baylor Bears football players
LSU Tigers football players
2000 births